Rahul Ravi is an Indian actor and former model. He made his debut in the Malayalam series Ponnambili and is best known for playing the lead role in the multilingual drama Nandini, thus establishing himself in the South Indian Television industry.

Biography
After completing his B.Tech. and MBA degrees, he became a model and emerged as the second runner-up in the Hairomax Beautiful hair competition 2011. After debuting in the Malayalam film industry as an antihero in the film Dolls, he essayed the lead roles in films like Kattumakkan and Dial 1091. 

In 2015, he was part of the Malayalam television serial Ponnambili in Mazhavil Manorama opposite Malavika Wales, playing the lead role of Haripadmanabhan. The serial became a hit. He then signed on to be a part of the Tamil supernatural television show Nandini headed by Raj Kapoor and produced by Khushbu. He had also hosted the fourth season of popular reality Show D4 Dancer. He is currently acting in the Tamil serial Kannana Kanne as Yuva, one of the primary protagonists.

He married Lakshmi Nair in 2020.

Filmography

Television
Serials 

Shows

References

External links
Rahul Ravi

1988 births
Living people
Male actors in Malayalam television
Male actors in Malayalam cinema
Indian male film actors
People from Thrissur
Male actors from Kerala
Male actors from Thrissur